A massive snowstorm hit Romania (along with westernmost regions of Moldova) in February 1954.

Heavy snowfall that month was recorded on the following dates: 1-4, 7-9, 17-19 and 22-24. Wind speed reached 126 km/h in Bucharest on February 3, a record that still stands. The maximum quantity of snow was recorded on the 3rd in Grivița: 115.9 L/m2 in 24 hours, another unbroken record. The thickest layer of snow, 173 cm, appeared in Călărași on February 3-4 and also remains a record. Snowdrifts reached 5 m in the southeast of the country.

Notes

1954 in Romania
1954 meteorology
1954 disasters in Romania
Natural disasters in Romania